Alto Araguaia is a city in the state of Mato Grosso in Brazil. Its population is 19,385 (2020) and its total area is 5,515 km2.

References 

Municipalities in Mato Grosso